Wellington Cézar Alves de Lima (born December 21, 1993 in Recife), known as Wellington, is a Brazilian football midfield who currently plays for Botafogo PB.

Honours
Santa Cruz
Campeonato Pernambucano: 2013, 2015
Campeonato Brasileiro Série C: 2013
Copa do Nordeste|2016]]

References

External links
 Wellington at playmakerstats.com (English version of ogol.com.br)
 
 

1993 births
Living people
Brazilian footballers
Santa Cruz Futebol Clube players
Botafogo Futebol Clube (PB) players
Association football midfielders
Sportspeople from Recife